WDCY (1520 kHz) is an AM Christian radio station broadcasting a Christian talk and teaching radio format. Licensed to Douglasville, Georgia, it serves the Atlanta metro area.  The station is owned by Word Christian Broadcasting Inc.  Much of the programming is simulcast with co-owned 1500 WDPC in Dallas, Georgia and 1300 WNEA in Newnan, Georgia.

WDCY is a daytimer, powered at 2,500 watts (800 watts during critical hours) but required to go off the air at night so it cannot interfere with Class A stations WWKB Buffalo and KAKC Oklahoma City.  AM 1520 is a clear channel frequency.    The transmitter is off Brown Street in Douglasville.

The station has been issued a construction permit by the Federal Communications Commission (FCC) to increase power to the maximum for commercial AM stations, 50,000 watts.  It would use a directional antenna pattern aimed toward Atlanta from a new transmitter location, but still not be on the air at night. The new proposed daytime directional antenna pattern will require a four tower array.

History
On April 4, 1964, the station signed on as WDGL.  It was owned by Douglas County Broadcasting and was powered at 1,000 watts in the daytime (500 watts during critical hours) but required to be off the air at night.

References

External links

RecNet query for WDCY

Radio stations established in 1970
1970 establishments in Georgia (U.S. state)
DCY
DCY